The LSA-Engines LSA850 is a family of German aircraft engines, produced by LSA-Engines of Berlin for use in light-sport aircraft.

Design and development
Introduced in 2015, the LSA850 series is based upon the Weber Motor MPE 850.

The LSA850 is a twin-cylinder four-stroke two-stroke, in-line,  displacement, liquid-cooled, gasoline engine design, with a helical gear mechanical gearbox reduction drive with a reduction ratio of 3.33:1. It employs electronic ignition and has a compression ratio of 9:1.

Variants
LSA850-105
LSA850-130

Applications
Carplane GmbH Carplane

Specifications (LSA850-130)

See also

References

External links

LSA-Engines aircraft engines
Two-stroke aircraft piston engines
Liquid-cooled aircraft piston engines
2010s aircraft piston engines